Baksheyev Dor is a rural locality (a village) in Yenangskoye Rural Settlement, Kichmengsko-Gorodetsky District, Vologda Oblast, Russia. The population was 32 as of 2002. There are 2 streets.

Geography 
Baksheyev Dor is located 70 km southeast of Kichmengsky Gorodok (the district's administrative centre) by road. Gar is the nearest rural locality.

References 

Rural localities in Kichmengsko-Gorodetsky District